In mathematical logic, the compactness theorem states that a set of first-order sentences has a model if and only if every finite subset of it has a model. This theorem is an important tool in model theory, as it provides a useful (but generally not effective) method for constructing models of any set of sentences that is finitely consistent.

The compactness theorem for the propositional calculus is a consequence of Tychonoff's theorem (which says that the product of compact spaces is compact) applied to compact Stone spaces, hence the theorem's name. Likewise, it is analogous to the finite intersection property characterization of compactness in topological spaces: a collection of closed sets in a compact space has a non-empty intersection if every finite subcollection has a non-empty intersection.

The compactness theorem is one of the two key properties, along with the downward Löwenheim–Skolem theorem, that is used in Lindström's theorem to characterize first-order logic. Although there are some generalizations of the compactness theorem to non-first-order logics, the compactness theorem itself does not hold in them, except for a very limited number of examples.

History
Kurt Gödel proved the countable compactness theorem in 1930.  Anatoly Maltsev proved the uncountable case in 1936.

Applications

The compactness theorem has many applications in model theory; a few typical results are sketched here.

Robinson's principle

The compactness theorem implies the following result, stated by Abraham Robinson in his 1949 dissertation. 

Robinson's principle: If a first-order sentence holds in every field of characteristic zero, then there exists a constant  such that the sentence holds for every field of characteristic larger than  This can be seen as follows: suppose  is a sentence that holds in every field of characteristic zero. Then its negation  together with the field axioms and the infinite sequence of sentences 

is not satisfiable (because there is no field of characteristic 0 in which  holds, and the infinite sequence of sentences ensures any model would be a field of characteristic 0). Therefore, there is a finite subset  of these sentences that is not satisfiable.  must contain  because otherwise it would be satisfiable.

The Lefschetz principle, one of the first examples of a transfer principle, extends this result.
One consequence is the following special case of the Ax–Grothendieck theorem: all injective complex polynomials  are surjective (indeed, it can even be shown that its inverse will also be a polynomial). In fact, the surjectivity conclusion remains true for any injective polynomial  where  is a finite field or the algebraic closure of such a field.

Upward Löwenheim–Skolem theorem

A second application of the compactness theorem shows that any theory that has arbitrarily large finite models, or a single infinite model, has models of arbitrary large cardinality (this is the Upward Löwenheim–Skolem theorem). So for instance, there are nonstandard models of Peano arithmetic with uncountably many 'natural numbers'. To achieve this, let  be the initial theory and let  be any cardinal number. Add to the language of  one constant symbol for every element of  Then add to  a collection of sentences that say that the objects denoted by any two distinct constant symbols from the new collection are distinct (this is a collection of  sentences). But any model of the extended theory has cardinality at least .

Non-standard analysis

A third application of the compactness theorem is the construction of nonstandard models of the real numbers, that is, consistent extensions of the theory of the real numbers that contain "infinitesimal" numbers. To see this, let  be a first-order axiomatization of the theory of the real numbers.

A similar argument, this time adjoining the axioms  etc., shows that the existence of numbers with infinitely large magnitudes cannot be ruled out by any axiomatization  of the reals. 

It can be shown that the hyperreal numbers  satisfy the transfer principle: a first-order sentence is true of  if and only if it is true of

Proofs

One can prove the compactness theorem using Gödel's completeness theorem, which establishes that a set of sentences is satisfiable if and only if no contradiction can be proven from it.  Since proofs are always finite and therefore involve only finitely many of the given sentences, the compactness theorem follows.  In fact, the compactness theorem is equivalent to Gödel's completeness theorem, and both are equivalent to the Boolean prime ideal theorem, a weak form of the axiom of choice.

One of those proofs relies on ultraproducts hinging on the axiom of choice as follows:

Proof: 
Fix a first-order language  and let   be a collection of L-sentences such that every finite subcollection of -sentences,  of it has a model   Also let  be the direct product of the structures and  be the collection of  finite subsets of   For each  let  
The family of all of these sets  generates a proper filter, so there is an ultrafilter  containing all sets of the form 

Now for any formula  in 
 the set  is in 
 whenever  then  hence  holds in 
Łoś's theorem now implies that  holds in the ultraproduct   So this ultraproduct satisfies all formulas in

See also

Notes

References

External links
 Compactness Theorem, Internet Encyclopedia of Philosophy.

Mathematical logic
Metatheorems
Model theory
Theorems in the foundations of mathematics